Samuel Moran may refer to:

Sam Moran, singer
Sam Moran (baseball)